Kaluvoya or Kaluvaya is a village and a Mandal in Nellore district in the state of Andhra Pradesh in India.

Geography

References 

Villages in Nellore district